Apoplanesia is a genus of flowering plants in the family Fabaceae. It belongs to the subfamily Faboideae.

Species
Apoplanesia comprises the following species:
Apoplanesia cryptopetala Pittier
Apoplanesia paniculata C. Presl—Palo de Arco

References

External links

Amorpheae
Fabaceae genera